Keel Mountain may refer to:

 Keel Mountain (Alabama)
 Keel Mountain (Oregon)
 Scandinavian Mountains, also known as Keel Mountains